Carlos de Jesús Alejandro (born 4 November 1965) is a Mexican politician affiliated with the PRD. He currently serves as Deputy of the LXII Legislature of the Mexican Congress representing Guerrero.

References

1965 births
Living people
Politicians from Guerrero
Party of the Democratic Revolution politicians
21st-century Mexican politicians
Deputies of the LXII Legislature of Mexico
Members of the Chamber of Deputies (Mexico) for Guerrero
Instituto Politécnico Nacional alumni
Universidad Autónoma Metropolitana alumni